Gilbert + Tobin is a leading Australian law firm with offices in Sydney, Melbourne and Perth. It provides legal services to corporate and government clients across Australia and internationally.

Established in 1988 by Danny Gilbert and Tony Tobin, the firm employs approximately 1000 people, and has one of the highest proportions of female partners of any major Australian law firm.

Gilbert + Tobin depart from the usual practice at similar law firms in their use of a flat hierarchy, with no formal band structures. This means that all of its legally trained employees are referred to as "lawyers", rather than associates or senior associates.

Gilbert + Tobin’s well-established base of corporate clients include many of the ASX 100 leading companies, major infrastructure and services providers, large financial institutions, transport and logistics companies, as well as government and public authorities.

In 2021, Gilbert + Tobin advised Afterpay Limited on the acquisition of Afterpay by Square. The A$39 billion deal is the largest public mergers and acquisitions deal in Australia's history.

Awards and recognition 
Gilbert + Tobin (G + T) has 20 practice areas ranked in the Chambers Asia-Pacific Guide 2021. It is also ranked by Chambers as a leading firm globally.

G + T was named the Most Innovative team headquartered in the Asia-Pacific and Australia in 2017 by the Financial Times and again in 2020. In 2020, it was awarded Intellectual Property Team of the Year by Lawyers Weekly and was named Australian Law Firm of the Year (101-500 Lawyers) at the Australasian Law Awards.

Other recent awards include:

 Legal 500 Asia-Pacific (2021) - Tier 1 in ten practice areas (Banking and Finance, Capital Markets, Competition and Trade, Corporate and M&A, Data Protection, Dispute Resolution, Intellectual Property, IT and Telecoms, Project Finance, and Restructuring and Insolvency.
 Australasian Law Awards (2020) - Corporate Citizen Firm of the Year.
 Best Lawyers Australia (2022) - Law Firm of the Year for Competition Law.
 Client Choice Awards (2021) - Most Innovative Law Firm.
 Mergermarket Australian M&A Awards (2021) - Technology, Media and Telecom M&A Legal Adviser of the Year and Private Equity Legal Adviser of the Year.

Corporate social responsibility 
Gilbert + Tobin is a foundation signatory to the National Pro Bono Aspirational Target.

In 2000, Danny Gilbert agreed to support a centre for public law at the University of New South Wales in Sydney, and in 2001 the Gilbert + Tobin Centre of Public Law was founded. It functions as a research centre specialising in constitutional and administrative law, Indigenous legal issues, and human rights.

G + T dedicates significant resources to its Indigenous Legal Cadetship Program, employing Indigenous law students on a part-time basis for the duration of their degrees in Sydney, Melbourne and Perth. The program aims to increase the number of Indigenous people entering the legal profession.

In 2017, G + T backed campaigns for marriage equality in the Australian Same-Sex Marriage Postal Survey. They provided pro-bono legal advice to a major campaign group and supported staff in canvassing voters.

Staff conditions 
Over 2018 and 2019, the New South Wales workplace regulator, SafeWork NSW, investigated Gilbert + Tobin on two separate occasions, following complaints of workplace fatigue and excessive work hours. The first inquiry was in response to allegations from a senior lawyer that the firm's junior lawyers regularly slept in offices and needed stimulant supplements to keep abreast of work demands. The firm had its HR department launch an internal investigation. Managing partner Danny Gilbert characterised the complaint as "vicious" and as containing "untruths". Gilbert said he was aware of the onerous demands placed on staff, but the nature of the business environment meant high workloads were unavoidable. He emphasised in an email to staff that, nevertheless, workloads should not compromise health and safety, and the firm was always ready to do better and find ways to relieve staff pressure.

After SafeWork met with management in January 2019, the regulator indicated it was satisfied, saying Gilbert + Tobin "had the organisational capacity and responsiveness to assess and address risks and issues as they arise", and declined to take further action. A separate complaint arose in November 2019 with SafeWork undertaking a workplace inspection at G + T’s Sydney offices, where they interviewed fourteen staff members. SafeWork were to provide a full report on the firms's workplace policies following their inquiry.

Some partners of other law firms were reportedly critical of what, in their view, appeared to be the minimisation and justification of adverse work conditions for, especially, young lawyers. There have been reports of similarly excessive hours and high pressure for staff across leading law firms in Australia, and at least one other case of regulator intervention.

References

External links
Official website

Law firms of Australia